Moores Pocket is a suburb in the City of Ipswich, Queensland, Australia.

Geography
As the name suggests, Moores Pocket is bounded by the winding Bremer River on all sides except the north-west where it is separated from the suburb of Tivoli by Boundary Road.

History
The origin of the suburb name is from Thomas Moore, an early blacksmith in the area.

The suburb was greatly damaged in the 1893 Brisbane River flood.

The suburb was flooded in the 2011 Queensland floods.

References

Suburbs of Ipswich, Queensland